Edwin Stanley (November 22, 1880 – December 25, 1944), was an American film actor.  He appeared in more than 230 films between 1916 and 1946. He was born in Chicago, Illinois and died in Hollywood, California. On Broadway, Stanley appeared in This Man's Town (1930), The Marriage Bed (1929), and The Donovan Affair (1926). Stanley was also a playwright.

Selected filmography

 The Fear of Poverty (1916) - Alfred Griffin
 Divorce and the Daughter (1916) - Dr. John Osborne
 King Lear (1916) - Edgar
 The Dummy (1917) - Mr. Meredith
 The Law of Compensation (1917) - Raymond Wells
 Miss Deception (1917) - Tom Norton
 Just a Woman (1918) - Fred Howard
 Marriages Are Made (1918) - James Morton
 Every Mother's Son (1918) - Eldest Son
 The Love Auction (1919) - Jack Harley
 Life (1920) - Dennis O'Brien
 Scandal for Sale (1932) - Hotel Resident (uncredited)
 Amateur Daddy (1932) - 1st Fred Smith
 Virtue (1932) - District Attorney
 If I Had a Million (1932) - Mr. Galloway - Bank Manager (uncredited)
 Rockabye (1932) - Defense Attorney (uncredited)
 No Other Woman (1933) - Judge
 Lucky Devils (1933) - Mr. Spence - A Director
 Treason (1933) - District Attorney
 Murders in the Zoo (1933) - Doctor (uncredited)
 International House (1933) - Mr. Rollins - Electric Company Boss (uncredited)
 Ann Carver's Profession (1933) - Clarkson - Bill's Boss (uncredited)
 Wild Boys of the Road (1933) - Merchant (uncredited)
 My Woman (1933) - Harry Mason—Studio Manager (uncredited)
 College Coach (1933) - Regent (uncredited)
 From Headquarters (1933) - Jones - Forensic Expert (uncredited)
 Let's Fall in Love (1933) - Roland Markwell (uncredited)
 The Big Shakedown (1934) - Harris - Board Member (uncredited)
 Upper World (1934) - Joe—Fingerprint Expert (uncredited)
 Now I'll Tell (1934) - Willie Coffey (uncredited)
 The Life of Vergie Winters (1934) - Mr. Truesdale
 You Belong to Me (1934) - Major Hurley - School Commandant
 Marie Galante (1934) - Sympathetic American (uncredited)
 Jealousy (1934) - Ringside Radio Reporter (uncredited)
 A Night at the Ritz (1935) - Doctor (uncredited)
 Princess O'Hara (1935) - Prosecuting Attorney (uncredited)
 Strangers All (1935) - Policeman in Film (uncredited)
 People Will Talk (1935) - Mr. Simpson (uncredited)
 Black Sheep (1935) - Oscar's Friend (uncredited)
 Stranded (1935) - Police Surgeon (uncredited)
 The Daring Young Man (1935) - Assistant Editor (uncredited)
 One Way Ticket (1935) - Airline Official (uncredited)
 Your Uncle Dudley (1935) - Businessman (uncredited)
 Man of Iron (1935) - Doctor (uncredited)
 Two Against the World (1936) - Board Chairman (uncredited)
 Gentle Julia (1936) - Mr. Atwater (uncredited)
 The Sky Parade (1936) - Prof. Ed Manderson (uncredited)
 The Law in Her Hands (1936) - First Trial Judge (uncredited)
 Counterfeit (1936) - Mason (uncredited)
 Bullets or Ballots (1936) - Judge in Newsreel (uncredited)
 Parole! (1936) - Bank President (uncredited)
 And Sudden Death (1936) - Dr. Grayson (uncredited)
 The White Angel (1936) - Minor Role (uncredited)
 The Final Hour (1936) - District Attorney Robertson (uncredited)
 Hot Money (1936) - Joe Thomas
 Jailbreak (1936) - Judge (uncredited)
 My American Wife (1936) - Party Guest (uncredited)
 China Clipper (1936) - Airplane Designer (uncredited)
 Second Wife (1936) - 3rd Partner (uncredited)
 Trailin' West (1936) - Maj. Pinkerton
 Stage Struck (1936) - Eugene (uncredited)
 Libeled Lady (1936) - Clerk (uncredited)
 The Public Pays (1936, Short) - John Allgren, Department of Justice (uncredited)
 The Accusing Finger (1936) - Fingerprint Expert (uncredited)
 Winterset (1936) - Courtroom Witness (uncredited)
 The Mandarin Mystery (1936) - Howard Bronson
 Lady from Nowhere (1936) - Editor
 Once a Doctor (1937) - Dr. Adams
 Dick Tracy (1937, Serial) - Walter Odette
 Marked Woman (1937) - Detective Casey
 Let Them Live (1937) - Roberts (uncredited)
 Behind the Headlines (1937) - Mr. Denning (uncredited)
 Easy Living (1937) - Second Partner (uncredited)
 West Bound Limited (1937) - Judge (uncredited)
 Stella Dallas (1937) - Helen's Butler (uncredited)
 She's No Lady (1937) - Butler (uncredited)
 The Footloose Heiress (1937) - Mr. Clark (uncredited)
 The Man Who Cried Wolf (1937) - Defense Attorney (uncredited)
 The Women Men Marry (1937) - Charley (uncredited)
 Charlie Chan on Broadway (1937) - Lab Technician (uncredited)
 Love Is on the Air (1937) - Mr. Brown - KDTS Lawyer (uncredited)
 Alcatraz Island (1937) - Second Trial United States Attorney (uncredited)
 Some Blondes Are Dangerous (1937) - Reilly
 Merry-Go-Round of 1938 (1937) - Doctor (uncredited)
 Beg, Borrow or Steal (1937) - Minister (uncredited)
 Borrowing Trouble (1937) - Haynes (uncredited)
 Missing Witnesses (1937) - Grand Jury Foreman (uncredited)
 The Buccaneer (1938) - Dolly Madison's Dinner Guest (uncredited)
 International Settlement (1938) - Doctor (uncredited)
 Born to Be Wild (1938) - Randolph
 Mad About Music (1938) - Defense Attorney, Film Within a Film (uncredited)
 Love on a Budget (1938) - Committeeman Emmett (uncredited)
 Flash Gordon's Trip to Mars (1938, Serial) - Gen. Rankin [Chs. 1, 9] (uncredited)
 Mr. Moto's Gamble (1938) - Doctor (uncredited)
 Accidents Will Happen (1938) - Judge (uncredited)
 The Nurse from Brooklyn (1938) - Ballistics Expert (uncredited)
 Alexander's Ragtime Band (1938) - Critic in Army Show Audience (uncredited)
 The Fighting Devil Dogs (1938, Serial) - The Lightning (Chs. 2-12) (voice, uncredited)
 Wives Under Suspicion (1938) - Forbes - Second Judge (uncredited)
 Speed to Burn (1938) - Police Detective (uncredited)
 Always Goodbye (1938) - Decorator (uncredited)
 Racket Busters (1938) - Second Doctor - Cotwald Sanitarium (uncredited)
 Little Tough Guy (1938) - District Attorney (uncredited)
 The Missing Guest (1938) - Dr. Carroll
 You Can't Take It with You (1938) - Executive (uncredited)
 Billy the Kid Returns (1938) - Nathaniel Moore
 Too Hot to Handle (1938) - Second Advertising Man (uncredited)
 Flight to Fame (1938) - Minor Role (uncredited)
 Young Dr. Kildare (1938) - Resident Doctor (uncredited)
 The Sisters (1938) - Doctor (uncredited)
 Girls on Probation (1938) - Sutton (uncredited)
 Adventure in Sahara (1938) - Dr. Renault (uncredited)
 The Shining Hour (1938) - Minister Performing Wedding (uncredited)
 Road Demon (1938) - Doctor (uncredited)
 Comet Over Broadway (1938) - Doctor (uncredited)
 The Little Adventuress (1938) - Tom Walton (uncredited)
 Sweethearts (1938) - Man in Lobby (uncredited)
 Newsboys' Home (1938) - Bailey (uncredited)
 Kentucky (1938) - Banker (uncredited)
 The Phantom Creeps (1939, Serial) - Dr. Fred Mallory
 King of the Underworld (1939) - Dr. Jacobs
 Scouts to the Rescue (1939, Serial) - Pat Scanlon
 Tail Spin (1939) - Doctor (uncredited)
 I Was a Convict (1939) - Dr. Craile
 Mr. Moto in Danger Island (1939) - Doctor (uncredited)
 Confessions of a Nazi Spy (1939) - U.S. Official (uncredited)
 Union Pacific (1939) - Businessman at Financiers' Meeting (uncredited)
 Undercover Doctor (1939) - Leery (uncredited)
 Charlie Chan in Reno (1939) - Police Chemist (uncredited)
 Unexpected Father (1939) - Dr. Evans (uncredited)
 Mutiny on the Blackhawk (1939) - Chief of Army Intelligence (uncredited)
 When Tomorrow Comes (1939) - Man on Bus With Child (uncredited)
 Lady of the Tropics (1939) - Mr. Hype (uncredited)
 The Star Maker (1939) - Gerry Member
 Espionage Agent (1939) - Secretary of State
 Eternally Yours (1939) - Reno Lawyer Jones (uncredited)
 Sabotage (1939) - Colonel Benson- Crash Investigator (uncredited)
 20,000 Men a Year (1939) - Chief Pilot Lawson (uncredited)
 Ninotchka (1939) - Soviet lawyer (uncredited)
 Too Busy to Work (1939) - Frazier
 Remember? (1939) - Doctor (scenes deleted)
 The Big Guy (1939) - Judge (uncredited)
 The Man Who Wouldn't Talk (1940) - Officer (uncredited)
 Parole Fixer (1940) - Jergens (uncredited)
 The Man from Dakota (1940) - Union Major Shot Trying to Escape (uncredited)
 Charlie Chan in Panama (1940) - Governor Webster
 Black Friday (1940) - Dr. Warner (uncredited)
 Johnny Apollo (1940) - Stock Exchange Official (uncredited)
 Hot Steel (1940) - John—Bank Director (uncredited)
 Murder in the Air (1940) - Congressman Courtney Rice (uncredited)
 Babies for Sale (1940) - Mr. Edwards
 The Man Who Talked Too Much (1940) - District Attorney Nelson
 Queen of the Mob (1940) - Federal Prosecuting Attorney (uncredited)
 Private Affairs (1940) - Floor Manager (uncredited)
 Andy Hardy Meets Debutante (1940) - Judge (uncredited)
 Manhattan Heartbeat (1940) - Official (uncredited)
 I Want a Divorce (1940) - Minister (uncredited)
 Diamond Frontier (1940) - Judge
 Knute Rockne All American (1940) - Committee Member (uncredited)
 The Quarterback (1940) - Interne (uncredited)
 East of the River (1940) - Commencement Speaker (uncredited)
 Always a Bride (1940) - (scenes deleted)
 Youth Will Be Served (1940) - CCC Camp Major
 Street of Memories (1940) - Judge (uncredited)
 Kiddie Kure (1940, Our Gang short) - Dr. Malcolm Scott
 Mysterious Doctor Satan (1940, Serial) - Col. Bevans
 Behind the News (1940) - Judge #2 (uncredited)
 Where Did You Get That Girl? (1941) - Harper (uncredited)
 Lucky Devils (1941) - Official (uncredited)
 The Face Behind the Mask (1941) - Dr. Alex Beckett (uncredited)
 Arkansas Judge (1941) - Judge Elmer Carruthers
 Ride, Kelly, Ride (1941) - Steward
 Flight from Destiny (1941) - Doctor (uncredited)
 A Man Betrayed (1941) - Prosecutor
 Meet John Doe (1941) - Democrat (uncredited)
 Mr. District Attorney (1941) - Public Defender (uncredited)
 Knockout (1941) - Doctor
 Men of Boys Town (1941) - Dr. Carlton (uncredited)
 Rookies on Parade (1941) - Officer (uncredited)
 Under Age (1941) - Judge
 Hurry, Charlie, Hurry (1941) - Mr. Mortimer Whitley (uncredited)
 Caught in the Draft (1941) - Medical Examiner (uncredited)
 Sergeant York (1941) - Editor (uncredited)
 Mountain Moonlight (1941) - Randolph
 Citadel of Crime (1941) - Minor Role (uncredited)
 Bad Men of Missouri (1941) - Prison Doctor (uncredited)
 Ice-Capades (1941) - Lawyer (uncredited)
 Private Nurse (1941) - Doctor (uncredited)
 Navy Blues (1941) - Rear Admiral (uncredited)
 Lydia (1941) - Dignitary on Podium (uncredited)
 The Night of January 16th (1941) - Hemingway
 The Man Who Came to Dinner (1942) - John
 Sealed Lips (1942) - Warden
 Blue, White and Perfect (1942) - Ship's Doctor (uncredited)
 A Gentleman at Heart (1942) - Beecham - Art Expert (uncredited)
 Pardon My Stripes (1942) - Andrews
 Who Is Hope Schuyler? (1942) - Gillian Stafford
 Fingers at the Window (1942) - Hospital Doctor (uncredited)
 Drums of the Congo (1942) - Col. S.C. Robinson
 This Gun for Hire (1942) - Police Captain at Train Station (uncredited)
 Small Town Deb (1942) - Mr. Blakely
 Syncopation (1942) - Goodwill's Attorney (uncredited)
 Private Buckaroo (1942) - Maj. Evans (uncredited)
 The Loves of Edgar Allan Poe (1942) - Dr. Moran
 Girl Trouble (1942) - Lehman
 Gentleman Jim (1942) - Bank President McInnes (uncredited)
 Seven Miles from Alcatraz (1942) - Prison Warden (uncredited)
 Ice-Capades Revue (1942) - Otis (uncredited)
 Shadow of a Doubt (1943) - Mr. Green (uncredited)
 Air Force (1943) - Doctor Attending Quincannon (uncredited)
 Flight for Freedom (1943) - Rear Admiral Gage (uncredited)
 Submarine Alert (1943) - Commanding Officer at Finish (uncredited)
 A Stranger in Town (1943) - Supreme Court Justice (uncredited)
 Yanks Ahoy (1943) - Dr. Hadley (uncredited)
 Johnny Come Lately (1943) - Winterbottom
 Minesweeper (1943) - Officer (uncredited)
 The Song of Bernadette (1943) - Mr. Jones (uncredited)
 O, My Darling Clementine (1943) - Hartfield
 Standing Room Only (1944) - Guest at Ritchie Home (uncredited)
 The Racket Man (1944) - Doctor (uncredited)
 Ladies Courageous (1944) - (uncredited)
 Buffalo Bill (1944) - Doctor (uncredited)
 Follow the Boys (1944) - Taylor (uncredited)
 Jamboree (1944) - Sam Smith
 Christmas Holiday (1944) - Room Clerk (uncredited)
 Louisiana Hayride (1944) - Studio Producer (uncredited)
 Strange Affair (1944) - Dr. Parrish (uncredited)
 Heavenly Days (1944) - Vice President Wallace (uncredited)
 The Missing Juror (1944) - Prison Warden (uncredited)
 The Princess and the Pirate (1944) - Captain of the King's Ship (uncredited)
 And Now Tomorrow (1944) - Mr. Raines (uncredited)
 Faces in the Fog (1944) - Fairbanks, Juror (uncredited)
 Youth on Trial (1945) - Commissioner Collins (uncredited)
 Conflict (1945) - Phillips
 Incendiary Blonde (1945) - Mr. Zweigler (uncredited)
 Two Years Before the Mast (1946) - Blake (uncredited)

References

External links

1880 births
1944 deaths
American male film actors
Male actors from Chicago
20th-century American male actors
American male stage actors
American male dramatists and playwrights
20th-century American dramatists and playwrights
20th-century American male writers